667 Squadron AAC is a squadron of the British Army's Army Air Corps (AAC).

History
No. 667 squadron was first formed on 1 December 1943 at RAF Gosport, Hampshire from 1662 and 1631 Flight and No. 7 Anti-Aircraft Practice Camp at RAF Shoreham, Kent for various anti-aircraft training duties. The squadron was initially equipped with Defiants and undertook target towing duties with these. It later received Hurricanes, Barracudas, Oxfords, Vengeances and Spitfires, before disbanding at Gosport on 20 December 1945. Between Dec 1943 and Dec 1945 squadron aircraft wore the codes U4.  During the Second World War the squadron formed part of No. 70 Group RAF, Air Defence of Great Britain from 1943 to 1944 and Fighter Command from 1944 to 1945

From 1989 to 2000 the squadron had a development and trials role as part of the Army Air Corps. The squadron continued in this rule until late 2020 when it was disbanded.

On 1 August 2021, No. 7 Flight AAC based in Brunei was redesignated as No. 667 Squadron. In 2022 the Bell 212 was replaced in Brunei with the RAF Puma HC2, operated by No. 1563 Flight RAF.

Aircraft operated

Squadron bases

References

Notes

Bibliography

External links
History of No. 667 Squadron
Histories for No.'s 651–670 Squadrons on RAF Web

Army Air Corps aircraft squadrons
Military units and formations established in 1943
Aircraft squadrons of the Royal Air Force in World War II
Military units and formations disestablished in 1945
667